Gasherbrum III, surveyed as K3a, is a summit in the Gasherbrum massif of the Baltoro Muztagh, a subrange of the Karakoram on the border between Xinjiang, China and Gilgit-Baltistan, Pakistan. It is situated between Gasherbrum II and IV.

Gasherbrum III fails to meet a  topographic prominence cutoff to be an independent mountain; hence it can be considered a subpeak of Gasherbrum II.

Gasherbrum III was one of the highest unclimbed summits in the world up to its first ascent in 1975, by Wanda Rutkiewicz, Alison Chadwick-Onyszkiewicz, Janusz Onyszkiewicz and Krzysztof Zdzitowiecki, members of a Polish expedition.

See also
 List of mountains in Pakistan
 List of highest mountains

Notes and references

Seven-thousanders of the Karakoram
Mountains of Gilgit-Baltistan